WOJB is a National Public Radio member on 88.9 MHz, and serves northwestern Wisconsin from the Lac Courte Oreilles Reservation southeast of Hayward, Wisconsin, United States. 
Founded in 1982 with the intention of bridging the culture gap between the Native American population in the area and their non-Native neighbors in a time of heightened racial tension, the station is now a fixture of the northwestern Wisconsin airwaves, presenting a variety of programming, much of it presenting the culture of the local Ojibwa community and the wider Anishinaabe culture.

The station also webcasts its programming via its website.

See also
List of community radio stations in the United States

Notes

External links
WOJB website

OJB-FM
NPR member stations
Community radio stations in the United States
Native American radio
Public broadcasting in Wisconsin